Fort Thomas Highlands High School, also known as Fort Thomas Highlands, is a public secondary school located in Fort Thomas, Kentucky. Operated by Fort Thomas Independent Schools, Highlands was founded in 1888.  The school took its name from the original name of Fort Thomas, "The Highlands". Enrollment for the 2018–19 school year was 1,036 in grades 9-12.

Academics
As of 2020, Highlands is ranked 242nd in the nation and second within Kentucky by U.S. News & World Report. They boast ACT and SAT scores well above both state and national averages. Approximately 90% of the school's graduates go to college, and it is the only public high school in the state with a chapter of the Cum Laude Society. Highlands also has chapters of the National Honor Society, National English Honor Society, and Mu Alpha Theta. Twenty Advanced Placement classes are offered and the school is consistently a local leader in National Merit Finalists. Until 2009, Highlands won the We the People: The Citizen and the Constitution State Championships in six out of seven years, and placed in the top 25 at the National Finals in 2007.

The school was named a 2007 No Child Left Behind Blue Ribbon School, the highest award that can be given to a school by the US Department of Education and received a national "High Schools That Work" Gold Achievement Award in 2008.

The Washington Post named Highlands the number one most challenging school in Kentucky in 2014.

Athletics
The school's nickname was "the Devils" until the 1930s, when the sports teams were renamed "the Bluebirds" due to public outrage from local churches concerning the use of "Devils." The school currently competes in the following sports: 
Archery (Coed),
Baseball (Boys),
Basketball (Coed),
Cheerleading (Coed),
Cross Country (Coed),
Dance Team (Girls),
Diving (Coed),
Esports (Coed),
Football (Boys),
Golf (Coed),
Swimming (Coed),
Soccer (Coed),
Fast-Pitch Softball (Girls),
Tennis (Coed),
Track and Field (Coed), and
Volleyball (Girls).

With the exception of football, Highlands plays in the AA division. The football team currently plays in 5A. Prior to the realignment effected in the fall of 2007 that expanded the sport from four divisions to six, the football team played 3A.

The Bluebirds football team won their 23rd state title in 2014 and in 2012 set a new record for consecutive state football championships, with six in a row. These are two of eight team state records that Highlands holds. Highlands is also ranked second nationally, and first in the state, in all-time wins with 842, and have finished the football season nationally ranked on eight occasions. The football team has had thirteen undefeated seasons, and 88 winning seasons out of a total of 98. The girls' soccer team won back to back state championships in 2005 and 2006, and the boys' soccer team was state runner-up in 2008. The girls' cross country team won four consecutive state championships from 2012 to 2015 and three consecutive  from 1978 to 1980 and again from 2002 to 2004. and the girls' track team also won state in 2009. Highlands has 51 state titles across all sports. The Bluebirds baseball team has won 3 consecutive regional championships (2015, 2016, 2017).

Journalism 
Highlands High School's primary school-authorized and student-written journalism source is The Hilltopper, a student-penned newspaper with the purpose of communicating to students and the greater Fort Thomas community about issues concerning the community's general welfare. Consisting of four sections, primarily news, sports, opinion and entertainment, there are also smaller individual categories or repeating segments such as "Crazy Kitchen Insanity" (focusing on cooking recipes) and "Voices In The Halls". The Hilltopper also publishes articles regarding national news, such as the 2022 Will Smith–Chris Rock slapping incident and the COVID-19 vaccine. The Hilltopper is currently staffed by 33 Highlands students.

In 2022, Highlands sophomore Carter Frimming started a Hilltopper-backed parody of Between Two Ferns (with the same name), in which Frimming interviews Highlands faculty and students in a similar manner to Galifianakis. Frimming's version of Between Two Ferns is notable for its deadpan comedy uncommon in school journalism. So far, Frimming has interviewed teachers Andrew Eckerle and Matt Ewald.

Notable alumni

 Rich Boehne American media executive
 Jac Collinsworth - Sportscaster 
 Gino Guidugli AFL player
 Ben Guidugli NFL player
 Chuck Kyle CFL player
 Jared Lorenzen NFL player
 Mike Mitchell NFL player
 Marty Moore NFL player
 Arquimides Ordoñez - MLS Player 
 Jerry Reynolds NFL player
 Homer Rice NFL coach
 John Schlarman  Kentucky Wildcats football Player, NCAA football coach 
 Derek Smith NFL player
 Rob Smith NFL player
 Jeff Walz Louisville Cardinals women's basketball coach

References

External links
 
 Official district site
 Historical Images of Fort Thomas Schools
 Site devoted to Highlands Football
 The Hilltopper official website

Educational institutions established in 1888
1888 establishments in Kentucky
Schools in Campbell County, Kentucky
Public high schools in Kentucky